These are the official results of the Women's Javelin Throw event at the 1997 World Championships in Athens, Greece. There were a total number of 29 participating athletes, with the final held on Saturday August 9, 1997. All results were made with a rough surfaced javelin (old design).

Medalists

Schedule
All times are Eastern European Time (UTC+2)

Abbreviations
All results shown are in metres

Records

Qualification
 Held on Thursday 1997-08-07

Final

See also
 1996 Women's Olympic Javelin Throw

References
 Results

J
Javelin throw at the World Athletics Championships
1997 in women's athletics